Jaroslav Vlček is the former chairman of the Czech Green Party.

References

Green Party (Czech Republic) politicians
Members of the Chamber of Deputies of the Czech Republic (1992–1996)